Frank Boyle (born February 20, 1945) is a retired American Democratic politician.  He served as a member of the Wisconsin State Assembly from 1987 to 2009, representing the far northwest corner of the state.

Early life and education 
Born in Phillips, Wisconsin, Boyle graduated from Phillips High School. He received his bachelor's degree from University of Wisconsin–Superior and did graduate work there and at University of Wisconsin–Madison.

Career 
Prior to entering politics, Boyle was a building contractor. He also served on the Douglas County, Wisconsin Board of Supervisors. He served as a Democratic Party member of the Wisconsin State Assembly, representing the 73rd Assembly District from 1986 to 2008, when he retired. He was succeeded by Nick Milroy who he endorsed.

References

External links 
 Follow the Money - Frank Boyle
2006 2004 2002 2000 1998 campaign contributions

1945 births
Living people
People from Phillips, Wisconsin
Politicians from Superior, Wisconsin
University of Wisconsin–Madison alumni
University of Wisconsin–Superior alumni
Businesspeople from Wisconsin
County supervisors in Wisconsin
21st-century American politicians
Democratic Party members of the Wisconsin State Assembly